Ate (minor planet designation: 111 Ate) is a main-belt asteroid that was discovered by the German-American astronomer C. H. F. Peters on August 14, 1870, and named after Ate, the goddess of mischief and destruction in Greek mythology. In the Tholen classification system, it is categorized as a carbonaceous C-type asteroid, while the Bus asteroid taxonomy system lists it as an Ch asteroid.

Two stellar occultations by Ate were observed in 2000, only two months apart. The occultation of the star HIP 2559 by 111 Ate was used to determine a chord length of 125.6 ± 7.2 km through the asteroid, giving a lower bound on the maximum dimension. During 2000, 111 Ate was observed by radar from the Arecibo Observatory. The return signal matched an effective diameter of 135 ± 15 km. The estimated size of this asteroid is 143 km, making it one of the larger asteroids.

Based upon an irregular light curve that was generated from photometric observations of this asteroid at Pulkovo Observatory, it has a rotation period of 22.072 ± 0.001 hours and varies in brightness by 0.12 ± 0.01 in magnitude.

References

External links 
 
 

000111
Discoveries by Christian Peters
Named minor planets
000111
000111
18700814